Kohlschütter is a lunar impact crater that cannot be viewed directly from the Earth as it lies on the Moon's far side. It is located a couple of hundred kilometers to the southeast of the Mare Moscoviense, and due south of the smaller crater Nagaoka. It is a relatively isolated formation surrounded by a multitude of smaller impacts typical of the battered far side.

The outer rim of Kohlschütter is worn and eroded, with a small crater across the northwest side, and smaller impacts along the west and northeastern edge. The southern rim is more shallow than elsewhere. The interior floor is relatively level, and unlike most far-side craters, it is filled with mare material.  Despite its small size, the mare has a short sinuous rille west of the central peak and a wrinkle ridge east of it.

Satellite craters
By convention these features are identified on lunar maps by placing the letter on the side of the crater midpoint that is closest to Kohlschütter.

References

 
 
 
 
 
 
 
 
 

Impact craters on the Moon